For other radio stations which may use "Wave" as a brand name, see Wave (disambiguation).

WAVE Radio (call-sign VPW-FM), a Belize City radio station operating since 1998, is the radio arm of the United Democratic Party (UDP). It is located at the corner of Ebony Street and the Belchina Bridge entrance, at the UDP Headquarters.

History 
WAVE Radio was formed on December 14, 1998 as an indirect result of the dismantling of the former Broadcasting Corporation of Belize. WAVE was located on Fabers' Road on Southside Belize City and headed by veteran radio journalist Brian Mossiah. Other veterans joining the staff included Ed Yorke (now deceased), Adrian Harris and Kenny Morgan, with popular youth announcer Olden Young joining the staff two months later. Ironically, the station's opening was reported for News 5 by Hyacinth Latchman, who currently works at WAVE as an announcer. Mossiah denied reports that the UDP had financed the establishment of WAVE, but those reports gained some steam following an incident on May 13, 1999.

1999 Michael Rudon false accusations 
WAVE's Young reported on May 13 that then editor of the Belize Times, Michael Rudon, was under lockdown for allegedly molesting a primary school student. Channel 5 and other media houses had been fed the same story, proven false. After checking with the police to confirm the story, WAVE claimed, they had gone ahead, believing in the accuracy of the report. Rudon called over to complain and WAVE's contact retracted the story, saying there had been a mistake in the police files. WAVE retracted onair and Channel 5 laid the blame at the door of then Senator, attorney, and editor of the Guardian, Audrey Matura, who had apparently been wronged by the Times editorial staff, though Matura denied it.

Takeover by the UDP and transition 
Entering the 2000s WAVE Radio faced several changes in staff. Mossiah, Harris, and Yorke had all left for Love FM and FM 2000 respectively, with Mossiah being named Government Press Officer in 2002. It is presumed that by this time the Opposition UDP moved WAVE to its headquarters on the Belchina Bridge. WAVE was now in transition as new stars emerged, led by Juliet Thimbriel, who became WAVE's general manager. The station lost the popular Olden Young to suicide in 2003. He was replaced by new stars as Hyacinth Latchman, Dale Anthony McDougal, Alfrain "Mr. Hype" Supaul and David "International DJ" Busch.

Primary signals 
 105.9 FM (Belize City)
 99.9 FM (elsewhere)

Other station taglines 
Ride the WAVE...Don't Bother with the Ripples!
Entertainment with an Attitude, Reaching High Altitudes!
The Baby of the Bunch...with the knockout punch! (refers to relative newness among radio counterparts)
 New Age Radio!

Personalities of WAVE Radio 
 Juliet Thimbriel: General Manager, host of "Fus' Ting Da Mawnin"
 Joe Bradley: co-host, "Fus' Ting Da Mawnin"
 Hyacinth Latchman: City Councillor, host "Millennium Woman"
 Kenny Morgan: DJ and activist, host "Light Chop to Choppy"
 Alfrain Supaul: DJ, host "Drivetime Splash"
 Dale McDougal: newsreader and technical director
 Paula Ack: news editor and Spanish-language newsreader

Guest Personalities 
 Michael Finnegan: Mesopotamia Area Representative, host "Mek Wave and Lik Road"
 Delroy Cuthkelvin: UDP strategist, host "Moment of Truth" (Sundays)
 Dymatics Sound Crew: DJ Dixxie, DJ Shine, DJ Dre, DJ Juice. Hosts Of "Sound The Big Thing"(Saturdays)
 Frank "A-3" Magdaleno: DJ, Radio Announcer and talk show Host.
 DJ Premier: DJ
 Remix Berto: DJ and Radio Announcer. Host of "Flaming Friday"
Capt Nicolas Sanchez

References

External links
 WAVE website

Radio stations established in 1998
Radio stations in Belize
United Democratic Party (Belize)
1998 establishments in Belize